Tituba (Barbados) was an enslaved woman who was one of the first to be accused of witchcraft during the Salem witch trials of 1692–1693. She was brought to colonial Massachusetts from Barbados by Samuel Parris, the minister of Salem Village.  She was pivotal in the trials because she confessed to witchcraft when examined by the authorities, giving credence to the accusations. She accused the two other women, Sarah Good and Sarah Osborne, of the same crime. She was imprisoned for over a year but never went to trial. It is unknown what happened to her after the case against her was dismissed by a grand jury in May 1693.

Early life 
Tituba's husband was John Indian, an Indigenous man whose origins are unknown, but he may have been from Central or South America, Tibitó, Colombia to be precise. It is said that she was named after her town or tribe. Tituba may have originally been from Barbados. Many historians, such as Elaine Breslaw and Charles Upham, gathered that Tituba was a Native American based on Samuel Fowler's writing, "Account of the life of Samuel Parris". Tituba may have originally been a member of the Arawak-Guiana native South American tribe. While there is no physical evidence to prove this theory, it is believed that she was taken from her tribe and forced into slavery in Barbados, where she was sold to the Thompson plantation and became the family cook, as most Native American slaves were. This evidence was concluded through slave-transport documents which described things such as head counts and names of the slaves. As Tituba interacted with a diverse group of people in Barbados, it is assumed that Barbados is the place where she picked up most of her knowledge about witchcraft from mistresses and other slaves. Once the head of the Thompson plantation died, Tituba was inherited by Samuel Parris and then she was brought to Massachusetts. The often unreliable records of the enslaved persons’ origins makes this information difficult to verify. There are historians such as Samuel Drake who suggest that Tituba was African. Her husband went on to become one of the accusers in the Witch Trials. They appear documented together in Samuel Parris's church record book.

Salem witch trials 

Tituba was the first person to be accused of practicing witchcraft by Elizabeth Parris and Abigail Williams. It has been theorized that Tituba told the girls tales of voodoo and witchcraft prior to the accusations. Tituba was allowed to speak against her accusers despite their race because it was not illegal for slaves to give testimony in court. She was also the first person to confess to practicing witchcraft in Salem Village in March 1692. Initially denying her involvement in witchcraft, Tituba later confessed to making a "witch cake", but she confessed to making it after she was beaten by Samuel Parris. Tituba also confessed to speaking with the devil and in her confession, she stated that he ordered her to worship him and hurt the children of the village. When she was questioned later, she added that she learned about occult techniques from her mistress in Barbados, who taught her how to ward herself from evil powers and reveal the cause of witchcraft. Since such knowledge was not supposed to be harmful, Tituba again asserted to Parris that she was not a witch, but she admitted that she had participated in an occult ritual when she made the witch cake in an attempt to help Elizabeth Parris. Tituba, Sarah Good, and Sarah Osborne were sent to jail in Boston to await trial and punishment on March 7, 1692.  Despite these confessions, there is no proof that she did the things to which she confessed.

Other women and men from surrounding villages were accused of practicing witchcraft and arrested during the Salem witchcraft trials. Tituba not only used these outlandish accusations to stir confusion among Massachusetts residents, but she also used them to displace the punishment and/or death sentence that could have been imposed upon her. By deflecting people's attention, she was able to prove that she was a credible witness and as a result of the recognition she received, her life and her reputation were both saved. Tituba must have been aware that she could not hide from the accusations which were being made against her due to certain prejudices which people held against her based on her ethnicity. She claimed not to be a witch and denied that accusation against her despite her use of occult practices, admitting that the devil visited her and Parris' determination to find her guilty. Her confession and accusations not only served as a scapegoat, they also served as a new form of entertainment to the residents of Salem as they experienced possessions because of her words. Not only did Tituba accuse others in her confession, but she talked about black dogs, hogs, a yellow bird, red and black rats, cats, a fox, and a wolf. Tituba talked about riding sticks to different places. She confessed that Sarah Osborne possessed a creature with the head of a woman, two legs, and wings. Since it mixed various perspectives on witchcraft, Tituba's confession confused listeners, and its similarities to certain stock tropes of demonology caused some Salem Village residents to believe that Satan was among them.

After the trials, Tituba remained in Boston Gaol, which had very poor living conditions for thirteen months, because Samuel Parris refused to pay her gaol fees. In April 1693, Tituba was sold to an unknown person for the price of her gaol fees. In an interview with Robert Calef for his collection of papers on the trials, titled More Wonders of the Invisible World: Being an Account of the Trials of Several Witches, Lately Executed in New-England, Tituba confirmed that Parris had beaten a confession out of her and then coached her on what to say and how to say it when she was first questioned.

In popular culture

The majority of fictional pieces that artistically or historically depict Tituba's life portray her as a Black woman or an "outgroup" by Puritan society, due to her racial and socioeconomic status as a South American Indigenous and an indentured servant woman or slave. Although it is not explicitly discussed in all of the movies, plays and books, that account for Tituba's conviction, it is quite possible that the "fear of strangers" in combination with the Western European traditional belief and understanding of witchcraft, made Tituba a prime target for witchcraft conviction. With reference to the historical understanding of Tituba and why she was convicted, it has been argued that the pre-existing ideas about "out groups" and stereotypical ideas of foreign cultures combined with fictional portrayals of witchcraft and sorcery works, has created a case where history and fiction shape each other. Essentially, the fictional works have assisted in the idea of what the Salem Witch Trials were like and what events lead to the convictions, trials and confessions, but without factoring in racial, political, religious and economic influences of the time, the portrayals of Tituba in media remain, for the most part, fictional.

In John Neal's 1828 novel Rachel Dyer, a socially isolated Matthew Paris (based on Samuel Parris) feels threatened by Tituba's relationship with John Indian and is motivated to accuse her of witchcraft as a result. Neal described her as a "female Indian" who "did the drudgery of the house".

Henry Wadsworth Longfellow, in his 1868 play entitled Giles Corey of the Salem Farms, describes Tituba as "the daughter of a man all black and fierce…He was an Obi man, and taught [her] magic." Obeah (also spelled Obi) is a specifically African and Afro-American system of magic."

Tituba is featured prominently in the 1953 play The Crucible by Arthur Miller. The image of Tituba as the instigator of witchcraft at Salem was reinforced by the opening scene of The Crucible, which owes much to Marion L. Starkey's historical work The Devil in Massachusetts (1949).

In Miller's play, Tituba is said to have come from Barbados, where she was taught how to conjure up spirits, and had allegedly dabbled in sorcery, witchcraft, and Satanism. The play suggests that Abigail Williams and the other girls tried to use Tituba's knowledge when dancing in the woods before the trials began; it was, in fact, their being caught that led to those events. With the original intention of covering up their own sinful deeds, Tituba was the one to be accused by Abigail, who had in fact drunk from a magic cup Tituba made to kill John Proctor's wife, Elizabeth, and to bewitch him into loving her. She and the other girls claimed to have seen Tituba "with the Devil". It is ironic that the belief that Tituba led these girls astray has persisted in popular lore, fiction, and nonfiction alike. The charge, which is seen by some as having barely disguised racist undertones, is based on the imagination of authors like Starkey, who mirrors Salem's accusers when she asserts that "I have invented the scenes with Tituba .... but they are what I really believe happened."

Tituba appears in the novel Calligraphy of the Witch (2007) by Alicia Gaspar de Alba as an Arawak Native American Indigenous from Guyana fluent in several languages, and the only person in the Boston area who understands Spanish.  She is a friend and English tutor to the indentured servant Concepción Benavidez who is accused of witchcraft in the Boston area because of her Mexican and Catholic culture.

In American Horror Story: Coven (2013–2014), young African-American witch Queenie states that she is a descendant of Tituba. Later in the series, Voodoo Queen Marie Laveau and Supreme witch Fiona Goode have an in-depth discussion of Tituba's history and legacy. They suggest her magic came from her Arawak ancestry.

Tituba is portrayed in the Jayce Landberg song Happy 4 U, featured on the album The Forbidden World (2020).

See also
 List of slaves
 List of people of the Salem witch trials

Citations

Bibliography
 

17th-century American slaves
17th-century births
18th-century deaths
17th-century Native American women
Barbadian slaves
People accused of witchcraft
People of colonial Massachusetts
People of the Salem witch trials
Place of birth unknown
Year of birth unknown
Year of death unknown
American women slaves